Grant Stafford and Kevin Ullyett were the defending champions, but Ullyett did not participate this year.  Stafford partnered Lan Bale, losing in the quarterfinals.

Jim Courier and Todd Woodbridge won the title, defeating Bob Bryan and Mike Bryan 7–6(7–4), 6–4 in the final.

Seeds

Draw

Finals

References 

Doubles